The 1983 Japan rugby union tour of Wales was a series of five matches played by the Japan national rugby union team in Wales in October 1983. The Japanese team won two of their matches, drew one and lost the other two. Wales did not award full international caps for their game against Japan.

Matches
Scores and results list Japan's points tally first.

References

 

Japan rugby union tour
Japan national rugby union team tours
Rugby union tours of Wales
tour
Japan